The Citroën C3 is a supermini car (B-segment) produced by Citroën since April 2002. It replaced the Citroën Saxo in the model line up, and is currently in its third generation. The third generation model made its appearance in June 2016, and went on sale in January 2017.

It is produced in a five-door hatchback body style, with the first generation also being produced in a two-door convertible version, called the C3 Pluriel. A three-door hatchback, with a similar design as the second generation, marketed as a premium model, was available as the DS3.

A mini MPV version of the C3 was announced in July 2008, called the C3 Picasso, and was unveiled at the 2008 Paris Motor Show. In South America, a mini SUV version, called the C3 Aircross, was produced and marketed only locally. In October 2014, the Citroën C3 was awarded most efficient small cars, with the premium car DS 3.

In September 2021, a separate model was introduced with the C3 nameplate for the Indian and South American markets bearing the CC21 internal codename. During its introduction, Citroën CEO Vincent Cobée mentioned that the "C3" is the trade name for all Citroën B-segment hatchbacks around the world.



First generation (FC/FN; 2002)

 
 

After Jean-Pierre Ploué was appointed Director of the Citroën Design Center in 2000, he designed the C3 under the leadership of Donato Coco, who was already responsible for Citroën Xsara Picasso.

The first generation of the C3 was launched at the 2001 Frankfurt Motor Show, as well as the 2001 Bologna Motor Show, and began marketing in January 2002, as a five-door hatchback. It was available with 1.1, 1.4 and 1.6 litre petrol engines, and 1.4 and 1.6 litre common rail diesel engines. 
All models came as standard with a five speed manual transmission, except for the Stop & Start model, which came with the SensoDrive gearbox, a five-speed automated manual transmission with paddle-shifters and manual and automatic modes. The top level was the only version that had the option of a four-speed hydraulic automatic transmission.

In accordance with the PSA Group policy, the C3's chassis was used for the Peugeot 1007 and the Peugeot 207. Many components of the C3 are the same as those of the Peugeot 206. Some versions of the C3 feature a start-stop system that can automatically cut the engine when not needed to save fuel, such as in traffic, and restart it briskly to move on again. The vehicle was loosely styled after the Citroën 2CV.

An offroad-looking model called C3 X-TR was marketed from 2005 to 2009.

Citroën C3 Lumiere

The Citroën C3 Lumiere was a concept car that previewed the production Citroën C3, it was initially released in 1998 as a five-door hatchback, with four seats and rear suicide doors for easy access for passengers to the rear seats. It featured a five-speed manual transmission, and a 1.1 L TU1 I4 petrol engine upfront.

Safety
The C3 in its standard European configuration received 4 stars for adult occupants and 2 stars for pedestrians from Euro NCAP in 2002.

Facelift 
The C3 was given a redesign in October 2005, with the front end featuring a more imposing bumper, wider lower air intake, single air intake slit below the restyled radiator grille, and a repositioned number plate. The rear of the car was also given redesigned light clusters, with crystal coloured midsections.

The passenger compartment was also enhanced, with the fitting of a restyled dashboard with a high-quality finish, as well as a newer, more modern instrument cluster making the driver information easier to read.

The addition of light metallic grey embellishers around the central section of the fascia and air vents contributed to the updated interior, as did the completely redesigned front and rear door panels and trims. The steering was also improved so that it weights up with speed. The Pluriel also received similar interior alterations but was otherwise unchanged.

As with the Peugeot 206+ and Renault Clio Campus, Citroën didn't yet end the original C3 despite the new generation arrival. It stayed offered on selected European markets. During Autumn 2009, the brand announces the first-gen C3 will be marketed under a new name : Citroën C3 Génération. However, a few weeks later, the name is changed to Citroën C3 Classic. This name is used in France but also in other countries like Greece or Italy. Various names are used across Europe like C3 Hit Classic (Belgium), C3 First (UK, Germany) or C3 First+ (Switzerland). The first-gen C3 has been manufactured in Spain until 2010, in France until Summer 2011 and sold across Europe until February 2011.

The South-American model stays manufactured and sold until 2012.

C3 Pluriel
Citroën marketed the C3 Pluriel from 2003 to 2010 as a convertible with five open top variations, hence the name. Pluriel is a cognate with the English plural. This model was exclusively assembled in Spain.

The Pluriel can be configured as a hatchback with a multi-layer insulated top; a full-length landaulet, operable partially or to the back window or any stage in between, with a buffet minimizing wind deflector over the windshield; a fixed profile convertible, with the roof open to the back window, the roof assembly folds into a well in the trunk floor; a full convertible where roof side rails are unlatched and removed. and as a roadster pick up, where the back seats fold to a pickup like a bed with a drop-down tailgate. The roof tended to let in water, even from new.

The C3 Pluriel was introduced in July 2003, and was originally offered with a choice of a 1.4 or a 1.6 L petrol engine, and a 1.4 L diesel engine. The 1.6 L petrol came fitted, as standard, with an automated manual gearbox. The Pluriel was withdrawn in July 2010.

In October 2013, Top Gear Magazine placed the C3 Pluriel on its list of "The 13 worst cars of the last 20 years", describing the car as "useful as a chocolate teapot."

Engines
1.1 L (1124 cc) TU1 I4, 60 PS (59 hp/44 kW) and 69 lb·ft (94 N·m)
1.4 L (1360 cc) TU3 I4, 75 PS (75 hp/55 kW) and 87 lb·ft (118 N·m)
1.4 L (1398 cc) DV4 HDi diesel I4, 70 PS (69 hp/51 kW) and 118 lb·ft (160 N·m)
1.4 L (1398 cc) DV4 HDi 16-valve diesel I4, 90 PS (89 hp/66 kW) and 147 lb·ft (200 N·m) (discontinued in 2005; could not meet EURO4 compliance)
1.4 L (1360 cc) ET3 16 valve I4, 90 PS (89 hp/66 kW) and 98 lb·ft (133 N·m)
1.6 L (1560 cc) DV6 HDi 16 valve diesel I4, 92 PS (91 hp/68 kW) and 159 lb·ft (216 N·m)
1.6 L (1560 cc) DV6 HDiF 16 valve diesel I4 with Diesel particulate filter, 110 PS (108 hp/80 kW) and 177 lb·ft (240 N·m)
 1.6 L (1587 cc) TU5 16 valve I4, 110 PS (108 hp/81 kW) and 108 lb·ft (146 N·m)

South America 
First-gen C3 has been manufactured in Porto Real PSA plant from 2003 to August 2012. This version was sold locally and also exported to other Mercosur markets. The South-American C3 significantly differentiated itself from its European counterpart in 2008 when it got a facelift, including exclusive front bumpers.

A limited number of CKD Citroën C3 have been assembled in Uruguay by local assembler Oferol.

Second generation (SC; A51; 2009)

The second generation of the C3 was revealed in June 2009, and made its official debut at the Frankfurt Motor Show in September 2009. It features a new body design, with a 108 degree field of vision windscreen, similar to the one of the larger C4 Picasso, which is available on all versions, except the entry model VT.

The new C3 builds on the curvy profile of the previous model and has a look in keeping with other Citroën models and the older C3, although it is longer and wider than the old model. The lights at the front, bonnet, dashboard assembly, and other components are shared with the DS3.

On the new C3, the instrumentation is a mix of analogue dials beneath a styled cowl and a digital display for the fuel and trip computer. There is no temperature gauge (unlike the DS3), but a red and blue warning lamp to show hot or cold engines which come on as required. The drag coefficient is 0.307 Cd.

In engineering terms, the PSA TU powerplants are carried over from the old car and Citroën also announced a new range of small petrol engines that PSA Peugeot Citroën developed in partnership with BMW. These "Prince" engines have double overhead 16 valve camshaft, on-demand oil and water pumps, and BMW's patent injection and ignition technology.

They are designed for low  emissions and for good performance and economy. The economy was improved by the standard-fit cruise control and speed limiter available on the VTR+, Airdream+, and Exclusive models.

All versions have a standard fit "Gear Efficiency Indicator" which graphically states what gear to be in and when to change up to optimise economy. They come in 1.4 95 bhp and 1.6 120 hp versions  with low emissions, as well as new diesel engines, all with  emissions of under 120 g/km, plus an "Airdream+" model with 99 g/km using a new 1.6 HDI  engine.

The New C3 was presented at the Frankfurt Motor Show in September 2009. It was launched in November 2009, as a 2010 model. Across Europe, the advertising slogan was known as "The Visiospace", playing on the merit of the large windscreen and the improved vision afforded.

Facelift

Launched at the Geneva Motor Show in March 2013, the C3 hatchback was revised to featuring updated exterior and interior, and more efficient engines. The C3 facelift comes with updated chevrons and bumper-mounted LED daytime running lights at the front and new tail light clusters combined with new reflectors set underneath the rear bumper.

Safety
The C3 in its most basic Latin American configuration received 4 stars for adult occupants and 2 stars for toddlers from Latin NCAP in 2015.

The C3 in its standard European configuration received 4 stars from Euro NCAP in 2009.

Variants

There are four trim levels in the C3 range, which range from the entry-level VT (which does not have the panoramic windscreen), the mid-range VTR+ and eco-efficient "Airdream+" (which has lower  emissions) to the top of the range Exclusive, which has half cloth half Alcantara seats, extra chrome outside, alloy wheels, an alarm, folding mirrors, and power windows all around.

Trim levels are denoted by a small badge on the rear window frame on the VT/VTR+ and Airdream+ and by a small chrome badge on each front door on Exclusive models. Norev has produced a 1:43 scale model of the new Citroën C3 in Botticelli Blue, Metallic Green, and black.

Engines and transmissions

By 2016, a  1.6HDi with 5-speed gearbox was available.

Third generation (SX/SY; 2016)

The official pictures of the new C3 were revealed on 29 June 2016. The C3 takes front styling cues from the facelifted Citroën C4 Picasso, as well as the Grand C4 Picasso. It receives optional side Airbump mouldings as used on the Citroën C4 Cactus.

The new C3 is offered with a choice of nine exterior colours, and three contrast shades that appear on the roof, foglight trims, side mirrors, and Airbump surrounds. Citroën claims the range will offer a total of 36 different colour combinations.

Safety
The C3 in its standard European configuration received 4 stars from Euro NCAP in 2017.

Facelift (2020) 
The restyled version was revealed in February 2020. The main evolutions are on the front and on the headlights with new LED's. There are two new colors, "Spring Blue" and "Rouge Elixir", and two new interior atmospheres called "Techwood" and "Emeraude".

Launched in 2023, C3 You is the new entry-level version.

Engines and transmissions

Sales and production

In May 2021, total production exceeded 4,500,000 units, including 1,000,000 third-gen C3.

See also
Citroën C3 Aircross
Citroën C3 Picasso
Citroën C3 (CC21)

Notes

References

External links

Official Citroën C3 UK microsite

C3
Subcompact cars
Euro NCAP superminis
Latin NCAP superminis
Hatchbacks
Convertibles
2010s cars
Front-wheel-drive vehicles
Cars introduced in 2002
Cars of Brazil